Palov is a Slavic masculine surname. Its feminine counterpart is Palova. The surname may refer to the following notable people:
Květoslav Palov, Czechoslovak and Australian cyclist
Zora Palová (born 1947), Slovakian glass artist

See also
Pilaf, a dish, which is sometimes called palov